Future Perfect is the debut studio album by American alternative rock band Autolux. It was released on October 26, 2004 by DMZ and RED Ink Records. The album was produced by musician and DMZ co-founder T Bone Burnett, and was primarily recorded at Sunset Sound Recorders in Los Angeles.

DMZ released Future Perfect on vinyl as a two-LP set, which later went out of print. After the label's demise, Autolux reissued the album themselves in 2009 (on their own label Autolux Music Entertainment) on one 180-gram LP, and again in 2015 (also on their own label, now renamed The Autolux Empire) as a two-LP set.

Musical style
Alternative Press described Future Perfect as an album of noise pop and psychedelic rock music. John D. Luerssen of AllMusic said that the album fuses the "guitar blur" of shoegaze with indie rock elements reminiscent of the music of Sonic Youth and Ivy.

Critical reception

Reviewing Future Perfect for Pitchfork, Peter Macia found that T Bone Burnett's "laissez-faire" production complemented Autolux's "intense dynamic", allowing the band "to speak for themselves". Macia said of their performance on "Turnstile Blues": "In the first 10 seconds of the album opener, Carla Azar shames most every beat-maker with her ridiculous Liebezeit-cum-Bonham percussion. Azar's sturdy and creative drumming provides the thrust of Greg Edwards' heavily reverbed and distorted riffs. Meanwhile, Eugene Goreshter sings whispery lullabies of escape and alienation, and his rumbling bass rattles the brain."

In 2016, Pitchfork ranked Future Perfect as the 44th best shoegaze album of all time.

Track listing

Personnel
Credits are adapted from the album's liner notes.

Autolux
 Carla Azar – drums, vocals
 Greg Edwards – guitar, vocals
 Eugene Goreshter – bass, vocals

Production
 T Bone Burnett – production
 Greg Edwards – recording on "Asleep at the Trigger"
 Stephen Marcussen – mastering
 Mike Piersante – recording
 Dave Sardy – mixing

Design
 Scott Bundy – photography
 Microscopic Butterflies – artwork
 C. Newcomer – photography
 R5-622 – cover photography

Charts

References

External links
 

2004 debut albums
Autolux albums
Albums produced by T Bone Burnett
Albums recorded at Sunset Sound Recorders